New Canaan is a town in Fairfield County, Connecticut, United States. The population was 20,622 according to the 2020 census.

About an hour from Manhattan by train, the town is considered part of Connecticut's Gold Coast. The town is bounded on the south by Darien, on west by Stamford, on the east by Wilton, on the southeast by Norwalk, and on the north by Lewisboro and Pound Ridge in Westchester County, New York.

New Canaan is known for its architecture and public parks such as Waveny Park, and a town center with boutiques. Residents sing carols on God's Acre every Christmas Eve, a town tradition since 1916.

History

In 1731, Connecticut's colonial legislature established Canaan Parish as a religious entity in northwestern Norwalk and northeastern Stamford. The right to form a Congregational church was granted to the few families scattered through the area. As inhabitants of Norwalk or Stamford, Canaan Parish settlers still had to vote, pay some taxes—no income tax, and many other modern taxes did not yet exist—serve on juries, and file deeds in their hometowns. Because Canaan Parish was not planned as a town when it was first settled in 1731, when New Canaan was incorporated in 1801, it found itself without a central common, a main street, or a town hall.

Until the Revolutionary War, New Canaan was primarily an agricultural community; after the war, its major industry was shoemaking. As New Canaan's shoe business gathered momentum early in the 19th century, instead of a central village, regional settlements of clustered houses, mill, and school developed into distinct district centers. Some of the districts were centered on Ponus Ridge, West Road, Oenoke Ridge, Smith Ridge, Talmadge Hill, and Silvermine, a pattern that the village gradually outgrew.

With the opening of the New York, New Haven and Hartford Railroad to New Canaan in 1868, many of New York City's wealthy residents discovered the  pastoral beauty of the area and built summer homes. Eventually, many of the summer visitors settled year-round, commuting to their jobs in New York City.

Lewis Lapham, a founder of Texaco and great-grandfather of long-time Harper's Magazine editor Lewis H. Lapham, spent summers with his family at their estate that is now  Waveny Park next to Talmadge Hill and the Merritt Parkway.

In the 1890s, editor Will Kirk of the Messenger wrote an editorial in response to area editors who chided him, saying New Canaan was the "next station to hell." An alleged remark by a parched Civil War veteran marching in the Decoration Day Parade on an unusually hot day prompted the exchange. The remark was found untrue and Kirk, after enduring the comments of others, wrote about a "dream" of approaching the Pearly Gates in the company of his fellow editors. All others were turned away, but he, Will Kirk, was welcomed, because he, in fact, was from the "Next Station to Heaven." Since then, the name has been controversial, with residents affectionately using the latter, and local critics of New Canaan still using the original nickname.

The "Harvard Five" and modern homes

New Canaan was an important center of the modern design movement from the late 1940s through roughly the 1960s, when about 80 modern homes were built in town. About 20 have been torn down since then.

"During the late 1940s and 1950s, a group of students and teachers from the Harvard Graduate School of Design migrated to New Canaan ... and rocked the world of architectural design", according to an article in PureContemporary.com, an online architecture design magazine. "Philip Johnson, Marcel Breuer, Landis Gores, John M. Johansen and Eliot Noyesknown as the Harvard Fivebegan creating homes in a style that emerged as the complete antithesis of the traditional build. Using new materials and open floor plans, best captured by Johnson's Glass House, these treasures are being squandered as buyers are knocking down these architectural icons and replacing them with cookie-cutter new builds."

"Other architects, well-known (Frank Lloyd Wright, for example) and not so well known, also contributed significant modern houses that elicited strong reactions from nearly everyone who saw them and are still astonishing today ... New Canaan came to be the focus of the modern movement's experimentation in materials, construction methods, space, and form", according to an online description of The Harvard Five in New Canaan: Mid-Century Modern Houses, by William D. Earls.

Some other New Canaan architects designing modern homes were Victor Christ-Janer, John Black Lee, Allan Gelbin, and Hugh Smallen.

The film The Ice Storm (1997) shows many of New Canaan's modern houses, both inside and out. The film (and Rick Moody's novel of the same name, upon which it's based) takes place in New Canaan; a mostly glass house situated on Laurel Road is prominently featured.

Geography 
New Canaan is the only municipality on the Connecticut Panhandle that does not border the coast. Such proximity to New York City proved worthy of its own connection to the New Haven Railroad, being the only town to do so. New Canaan station and Talmadge Hill station are both on the New Canaan Branch of the New Haven Line, and transfer is possible in Stamford south to Manhattan. Many New Canaan residents commute to New York regularly, with travel time to Grand Central Terminal around 65 minutes. New Canaan is also heavily served by the historic Merritt Parkway, as the third municipality when driving through Connecticut from New York City.

Amenities
The downtown area consists of many restaurants, a library, the Victorian train station, antique shops, a book store, a saddlery boutique, and various fine clothing and interior decorating shops. In addition to the many local boutiques and businesses, many national chain stores can be found in the downtown area, including Ralph Lauren and Ralph Lauren Children, Ann Taylor, J. McLaughlin, Papyrus, Vineyard Vines, Le Pain Quotidien, and Starbucks, among others. Furthermore, there are several churches in the town (Catholic and various Protestant denominations), as well as the historic Roger Sherman Inn, established in 1740. Most major banks and many wealth management firms have a presence in New Canaan, including JPMorgan Chase, Merrill Lynch, Wells Fargo, UBS, Citibank, and Bank of America. Several hedge funds are also based in New Canaan.

The town includes the following sections: New Canaan Town Center, Talmadge Hill, Ponus Ridge, West, Oenoke Ridge, Smith Ridge, and part of Silvermine (which extends into Norwalk and Wilton).

Government

Taxes 
In 2023, the mill rate of New Canaan was 18.372.

Emergency services

Emergency medical services
The New Canaan Volunteer Ambulance Corps  is a free, all-volunteer ambulance corps with three ambulances and two paramedic fly-cars. Founded in 1975, the unit is located at 182 South Avenue and offers regular EMT courses. EMTs are all volunteers, while paramedic services are contracted to Norwalk Hospital. The New Canaan Emergency Medical Services Unit and the Norwalk Hospital Unit were featured on Rescue 911, as they saved the life of a fire captain who was suffering a heart attack.

Fire department
The New Canaan Fire Department employs the professional firefighters of the New Canaan Fire Department and  the volunteers of the New Canaan Fire Company, No. 1. Founded in 1881, the New Canaan Fire Department is a combination professional/volunteer fire department that operates out of a fire station located near the center of town, with a fire apparatus fleet of engines and other vehicles. The New Canaan Fire Department responded to 886 calls for service in 2009. The New Canaan Fire Department was featured on Rescue 911 when they saved a fire captain who was suffering a heart attack.

Police department
The New Canaan Police (NCPD)  are headquartered at 174 South Avenue. The Department has forty-five sworn officers, five full-time civilians and two school crossing guards. The primary mission of the NCPD and its officers is the protection of all persons and properties within its jurisdiction. The NCPD responded to 16,741 calls during 2012.

Politics

New Canaan was one of five towns in Connecticut that backed former Governor John Kasich of Ohio over Donald J. Trump in the 2016 Republican presidential primary. Kasich received 1,362 votes (47.84%) ahead of Trump, who garnered 1,168 votes (41.03%). U.S. Senator Ted Cruz of Texas finished third with 262 votes (9.20%).

Demographics

As of the census of 2000,  19,395 people, 6,822 households, and 5,280 families were residing in the town. The 7,141 housing units averaged 322.7 per square mile (124.6/km). The racial makeup of the town was 95.27% White,  1.04% African American, 0.04% Native American, 2.29% Asian,  0.39% from other races, and 0.98% from two or more races. Hispanics or Latinos of any race were  1.74%  of the population.

Of the 6,822 households, 41.7% had children under the age of 18 living with them, 69.2% were married couples living together, 6.6% had a female householder with no husband present, and 22.6% were not families. About 19.4% of all households were made up of individuals, and 9.3% had someone living alone who was 65 years of age or older. The average household size was 2.83, and the average family size was 3.26.

In the town, the population was distributed as 31.2% under the age of 18, 3.3% from 18 to 24, 25.4% from 25 to 44, 26.6% from 45 to 64, and 13.5% who were 65 years of age or older. The median age was 40 years. For every 100 females, there were 91.2 males. For every 100 females age 18 and over, there were 85.7 males.

Per the 2000 Census, the median income for a household in the town was $141,788, and for a family was $175,331. Males had a median income of $100,000 versus $53,924 for females. The per capita income for the town was $82,049. About 1.4% of families and 2.5% of the population were below the poverty line, including 2.2% of those under age 18 and 2.2% of those age 65 or over.

Education

The New Canaan Public Schools system is considered to be one of the best in Connecticut. It has also gained national recognition for its high performance; for example, a recent edition of Forbes rated New Canaan as the third-ranked school district in the United States "for home value" for communities with a median home price of $800,000 or greater. In 2019, New Canaan High School was ranked the sixth-best public high school in Connecticut behind Darien and Weston, and one of the top in the nation.

In 2009, the district was the highest-performing school district in the state based on the frequency of top-tier performances on the Connecticut Mastery Tests (CMTs), which are administered to all third- through eighth-graders, and the Connecticut Academic Performance Tests (CAPTs), which are given to 10th-graders. In 2008, the median SAT score (verbal, math and writing) for district students was 1804, the highest in Connecticut.

In its November 2009 edition, Connecticut magazine rated New Canaan's school system first among 29 towns with a population of 15,000–25,000. That category included Darien, Wilton, Ridgefield, Avon, Simsbury, Farmington, Southbury, Guilford, and other high-performing districts. The ranking was based on 2007–2009 CMTs, results from the 2007–2009 CAPTs, local SAT scores for 2006–2008, and the percentage of 2007 high school graduates who enrolled in college.

Twenty-two students in the New Canaan High School class of 2009 were National Merit Commended Scholars. In addition, four students were National Merit Scholars, four were National Merit Semifinalists, and one was an Hispanic National Recognition Scholar.

Of the New Canaan High School graduates who enrolled in college in the fall of 2009, 30% did so at a college designated "Most Competitive" by Barron's magazine, 24% enrolled at an institution considered "Highly Competitive", and 26% entered a college deemed to be "Very Competitive".

The New Canaan High School Library was the recipient of the 2010 National School Library Program of the Year Award, given by the American Library Association. In addition to the award, the high school also received a $10,000 prize donated by Follet Library Resources.

The New Canaan school system is also notable for its achievements in extracurricular activities. In 2010, the New Canaan High School won the FCIAC Cup, given to the most successful athletic program among the 19 high schools competing in the Fairfield County Interscholastic Athletic Conference. The New Canaan High School drama program won seven awards at the 2010 Connecticut High School Musical Theatre Awards.

New Canaan is one of the few school systems in Connecticut to offer foreign-language instruction to students  before middle school, as a Spanish program exists for all grades to expose students to a foreign language earlier in their lives. Grades 6–12 have language offerings including French, Latin, Mandarin Chinese, and Spanish.

In June 2012, 24/7 Wall St. ranked New Canaan as the eighth-wealthiest school district in the United States.

New Canaan has five public schools:
Elementary Schools: West School, South School, and East School
Middle School: Saxe Middle School
High School: New Canaan High School

New Canaan also has three private schools:
St. Aloysius School K–8
St. Luke's School: 5–12
New Canaan Country School: Pre-K–9

Points of interest

 New Canaan Nature Center
 Waveny Park on South Avenue "was developed in 1912 by Lewis Lapham on what had been Prospect Farm, an early summer estate.
 Silvermine Arts Center

On the National Register of Historic Places

 Hampton Inn – 179 Oenoke Ridge; also known as The Maples Inn, it was built by the Elwood brothers in Queen Anne, Colonial Revival style. (added November 27, 2004)
 Hanford Davenport House – 353 Oenoke Ridge (added September 3, 1989)
 John Rogers Studio – 33 Oenoke Ridge; built in 1878 by John Rogers, who was called "the people's sculptor" in the later 19th century. The studio houses a collection of the artist's famous groups of statuary, many sculpted on site. The studio was closed during needed restoration and scheduled to reopen in the summer of 2006 (added November 15, 1966). "He used this studio from 1876 to the end of his life. The John Rogers studio houses one of the finest collections of Rogers Groups in the nation."
 Landis Gores House – 192 Cross Ridge Rd. "With its flat-roofed single-story form, full-height glass walls, and emphasis on horizontal planes, the house he designed for himself in New Canaan is an outstanding example" of modernist architecture. (added April 21, 2002)
 Maxwell E. Perkins House – 63 Park St. (added June 6, 2004)
 Philip Johnson Glass House – 798–856 Ponus Ridge Rd. (added March 18, 1997)
 Richard and Geraldine Hodgson House – 881 Ponus Ridge Rd. (added February 28, 2005)

Seasonal events
New Canaan Nature Center Fall Fair: The fair offers activities for all ages from hay mazes to Old Faithful Antique Fire Truck rides to apple sling shots.

All Hallows Eve (Halloween) Parade: No matter your costume, children of all ages and their dogs can receive a goody bag and march in the Parade led by Old Faithful Antique Fire Truck which is sponsored by the New Canaan Chamber of Commerce.

Holiday Stroll: Hosted by The Chamber of Commerce, downtown New Canaan celebrates with Christmas carolers, the lighting of the trees along Elm Street, the arrival of Santa Claus, and extended store hours.

Christmas Carolling on God's Acre:  since 1919 New Canaan residents have been gathering on God's Acre every Christmas Eve to sing Christmas carols with the New Canaan Town Band. The New Canaan town band was founded in 1831 and is the second oldest town band in the United States.

Easter Egg Hunt: At the Annual Town Easter Egg Hunt, sponsored by the Young Women's League of New Canaan, children are able to collect candy-filled Easter eggs, get their faces painted, take pictures with the Easter bunny, and many other festive activities.

Saint Mark's May Fair: carnival rides and May Fair's famous strawberry shortcake.

Family Fourth Fireworks: Town residents gather at Waveny Town Park for picnicking, live music, bounce houses, and fireworks.

Gallery

Institutions and organizations 

 New Canaan Museum & Historical Society – operates seven museums, preserves five historic buildings, collects and preserves material thought to be of local historical value, and supports education programs such as school tours, special exhibits, seminars and publications on New Canaan history. The society was founded in 1889 and is housed in New Canaan's first town hall.
 Harmony Lodge No. 67 Ancient, Free & Accepted Masons – the oldest voluntary society in the Town of New Canaan. It was chartered by the Most Worshipful Grand Lodge of the State of Connecticut and was the first masonic lodge in lower Fairfield County since 1763. The only masonic lodges in the area at that time were Union Lodge No. 5 of Stamford and St. John's No. 6 in Norwalk. This meant that the brothers of Canaan Parish, prior to 1825, had to meet either at Union No. 5 which often physically met at Greenwich, Stamford and sometimes Bedford, NY and St. John's No. 6 in Norwalk. Once Canaan Parish was incorporated into a separate town, Brothers Samuel Carter, Jr., John Seely, Eliphalet Weed and several other members, requested the recommendation of St. John's Lodge No. 6 in Norwalk to the Grand Lodge for a charter to establish a new lodge in the Town of New Canaan which was granted on May 30, 1825. Also during that year, New Canaan's first town hall building was nearly complete and the town offered Harmony Lodge No. 67 the upstairs area as a meeting hall for their lodge for the total annual cost of $20. On January 2, 1917 Francis E. Green, who had bought the old Baptist Church on Main Street, which still stands today next to the present fire house, sold this building to the Fellowcraft Club of New Canaan, Inc. making this Harmony Lodge's first permanent home. In 1954 the lodge in a three-way swap bought the old Methodist Church building on Main Street, and Harmony Lodge No. 67 has been at this present sight ever since.
 Silvermine Arts Center
 New Canaan Red Cross
 New Canaan Land Trust
 New Canaan Library
 Grace Farms

Media
New Canaan is served by a town newspaper, New Canaan Advertiser, a Hearst owned publication. Two daily newspapers also serve the surrounding area: Connecticut Post and Greenwich Time. Moreover, Newcanaanite and the New Canaan Patch produce online news for residents.

Notable people

New Canaan in media

In film

Movies at least partially filmed in, or involving, New Canaan:

The Best Laid Plans (2009)
Made for Each Other (2009)
Revolutionary Road (2008)
The Stepford Wives (2004)
The Object of My Affection (1998)
The Ice Storm (1997)
Gentleman's Agreement (1947)

Music 
 New Canaan, by Bill Wurtz. In the song, he initially erroneously refers to the town as being in Pennsylvania before admitting the town's true state.

Books
The Ice Storm, by Rick Moody

In popular culture

"It's [Darien's] detestable, but that's the way it is. It's even worse in New Canaan. There, nobody can sell or rent to a Jew." Gentleman's Agreement (1947 film).
The 1955 novel Auntie Mame takes place partly in New Canaan, disguised under the name of "Mountebank" but identified (in the stage version) as "Just passed Darien. You'll love it. It's the most restricted community in our part of Connecticut."
New Canaan author Edward Eager set two of his children's books in the town: Magic or Not (1959) and The Well-Wishers (1960).
In The Cricket In Times Square (1960), main character Chester Cricket lives near New Canaan.
The Neighbors are Scaring My Wolf by comic writer Jack Douglas was a 1968 book based on his experiences living in town.
The Official Preppy Handbook (1980) makes reference to New Canaan as one of the "preppiest" towns in the country.
In the 1997 movie Fools Rush In, Matthew Perry's character grew up in New Canaan.
The exteriors of Waveny Mansion are used as Palmer Cortlandt's home in the ABC soap opera All My Children.
Karen suggests that Jack's father may be one of the "eight Black brothers of New Canaan, CT" in an episode of Will and Grace.
In the ABC drama Commander in Chief, Geena Davis's family home was in New Canaan.
In one of the books in the series Gossip Girl, a minor character says he needs to stop in New Canaan.
In the ABC television series Sports Night, managing editor Isaac Jaffe (played by Robert Guillaume) lives in New Canaan.
In the USA television series Royal Pains Hank tells Tucker to take his father to a fictional rehab center called Simon Ranch in New Canaan CT.
In the Syfy television series Warehouse 13, in "There's Always a Downside", former Warehouse agent Hugo moves to New Canaan with his nephew and calls the Warehouse agents to retrieve a bag of marbles that caused students in a fictitious school to be consumed with a single, overriding goal.
In the Stephen King series The Dark Tower, protagonist Roland Deschain hails from a fictional city called Gilead, which in turn is nestled in a fictional country/ state called New Canaan.
In CW TV show Supernatural, episode Ask Jeeves (Season 10, Episode 6), the Winchester brothers take a case in New Canaan, CT

Further reading
A Guide to God's Acre, a walking tour of the Historic District; available from the New Canaan Historical Society.
My Impressions of the Hour, a journal written by an early New Canaan teacher, Margaret Mary Corrigan; available from the society.
New Canaan: Texture of a Community, available from the society.
Portrait of New Canaan, available from the society.
A Student's Memoir, edited by Robert W.P. Cutler. A history of the Little Red Schoolhouse, based on recollections of some of the school's graduates.

References

External links

 
Towns in Fairfield County, Connecticut
Populated places established in 1801
Towns in the New York metropolitan area
Towns in Connecticut